Events from the year 1862 in Canada.

Incumbents
Monarch — Victoria

Federal government
Parliament — 7th

Governors
Governor General of the Province of Canada — Viscount Monck
Colonial Governor of Newfoundland — Alexander Bannerman
Governor of New Brunswick — Arthur Charles Hamilton-Gordon
Governor of Nova Scotia — George Phipps, 2nd Marquess of Normanby
Governor of Prince Edward Island — George Dundas

Premiers
Joint Premiers of the Province of Canada –
John A. Macdonald, Canada West Premier (until May 24)
George-Étienne Cartier, Canada East Premier (until May 24)
John Sandfield MacDonald, Canada West Premier
Louis-Victor Sicotte,  Canada East Premier
Premier of Newfoundland — Hugh Hoyles
Premier of New Brunswick — Samuel Leonard Tilley
Premier of Nova Scotia – Joseph Howe
Premier of Prince Edward Island – Edward Palmer

Events
April 7 – United Kingdom-United States treaty for suppression of African slave trade is signed.
May 20 – Macdonald-Cartier government falls. Free interprovincial trade granted by the Crown.
August 2 – Victoria, British Columbia, is incorporated as a city

Full date unknown
The first female student is accepted into Mount Allison University in Sackville, New Brunswick
The 1862 Pacific Northwest smallpox epidemic sweeps through Fort Victoria area and up the length of the northwest coast, killing an estimated 20,000 First Nations people
William Duncan, an Anglican missionary on the northwest coast, establishes the village of Metlakatla with 50 Tsimshian followers, who adopt the Christian faith and a European lifestyle. By 1880, more than 1,000 converts live there.
Construction begins on the Cariboo Wagon Road to link coastal shipping to Barkerville and the Cariboo goldfields.

Arts and literature

Births
January 9 – Joseph-Octave Samson, businessperson, politician and 28th Mayor of Quebec City (died 1945
June 29 – William Johnston Tupper, politician, 12th Lieutenant Governor of Manitoba (died 1947)
July 8 – Josephine White Bates, Canadian-born American author (died 1934)

Deaths
August 8 – Allan MacNab, businessman, soldier, lawyer and politician (born 1798)
August 18 – Simon Fraser, fur-trader and explorer (born 1776)

Historical documents
Published letter describes Fraser River riches in the Cariboo Gold Rush

Map of British Columbia gold regions, including "Routes of Communication with the Cariboo Mines"

Settling Indigenous people near Winnipeg is opposed by residents in published letter

References

 
Canada
Years of the 19th century in Canada
1862 in North America